The 2006 PBA Philippine Cup Finals was the championship series of the 2005-06 PBA season's 2006 PBA Philippine Cup of the Philippine Basketball Association (PBA). The series was a best of seven affair and was the 91st championship disputed in the league. The teams competing are first-seed Purefoods Chunkee Giants and the third-seed Red Bull Barako in a rematch of the finals of the previous conference.

Qualification
 Purefoods Chunkee Giants
 Top seed, qualified for the best-of-seven semifinals outright
 Came back from a 1–3 series deficit against Alaska Aces and won the semifinal series, four games to three
 Red Bull Barako
 Finished third after the elimination round
 Defeated Barangay Ginebra Kings in the quarterfinal series, 3–2
 Won semifinals against San Miguel Beermen, 4–3

Rosters

Series scoring summary
The following scoring summary is written in a line score format, except that the quarter numbers are replaced by game numbers.
 
† denotes number of overtimes

Games summary

Kerby Raymundo scored a career-high 30 points while Yee added 12 points including five crucial free throws in the last two minutes. Purefoods pummeled Red Bull with a 60.9 percent field-goal shooting in the second quarter and the Giants, nursing a 23–22 edge at the end of the opening period, zoomed to a 53–34 spread at halftime. The Bulls made a fiery chase in the third quarter. They were ahead 97–94 but went scoreless in the last 1:55 of play. Yee canned in two charities off a foul by Villanueva to tie the count at 97-all and then Raymundo scored on a 15-foot jumper as the Giants surge ahead, 99–97, with time down to 30.9 seconds. 

The Giants were off to a great start in the first quarter by taking a 12-point lead, Red Bull bounces back behind Lordy Tugade and the rest of the team to take a 48–39 halftime lead. Richard Yee put another sterling performance by banging all of his 17 points in the second half while Marc Pingris pumped in a career-high 21 points, most of them in the shaded area to help the Giants pull away.

Celino Cruz and Lordy Tugade fired all of Red Bull's seven three-pointers, most of them done in a fashion that riled the Giants while putting up a tough and gritty defense. Enrico Villanueva, Junthy Valenzuela and Cyrus Baguio also had their sparkling moments that helped the Bulls to pull away in the third period.

Purefoods started hot from the get go with key games from newly crowned MVP James Yap and Most Improved Player Marc Pingris. The Giants led by as many as 34 points and the Bulls never looked back.

The Bulls came back from 15 points down. After Celino Cruz tied the count at 90-all with a triple and Enrico Villanueva and Larry Fonacier went to work, the Giants suddenly got cold feet. Season MVP James Yap muffed his last seven attempts from three-point range while Kerby Raymundo missed a couple of point-blank attempts.

References

External links
 Philippine Basketball Association official website

2006
2005–06 PBA season
Magnolia Hotshots games
Barako Bull Energy Boosters games
PBA Philippine Cup Finals